Obese: A Year to Save My Life is a British documentary, reality, weight loss show that was broadcast on Sky1 from 2 January to 27 February 2012, produced, directed and filmed by Luke Campbell and Adam Kaleta. Nine episodes were originally created for the first series, which starred American fitness expert Jessie Pavelka. Pavelka helped nine morbidly obese British men and women help battle against their weight over the length of a year. The program finished after one series but was renamed and brought back in 2013 as "Fat: The Fight of My Life" which ran for another 10 episodes.

Series

Obese: A Year to Save My Life

References

External links

Sky UK original programming
2012 British television series debuts
2012 British television series endings
Obesity in the United Kingdom